is a compilation album by the Japanese duo Pink Lady, released on December 5, 1980. It features the new song "Sekai Eiyushi".

Track listing 
All lyrics written by Yū Aku, except where indicated; all music is composed and arranged by Shunichi Tokura, except where indicated.

Charts

References

1980 compilation albums
Japanese-language compilation albums
Pink Lady (band) compilation albums
Victor Entertainment compilation albums